Nicholas C. Peroff (born May 19, 1944) is an American political scientist, public administrator and professor in Native American studies and Complexity Theory at the Henry W. Bloch School of Management at the University of Missouri-Kansas City, he formerly held teaching positions in Taiwan, South Korea and South Africa.

The Secretary of International Relations Council, he was the former President of the Western Social Science Association (2002-2003). A veteran of the Vietnam War, he was named Public Administrator of the Year, Kansas City by the American Society for Public Administration in 2009.

Background
Born and raised in Wisconsin, U.S. he received a B.A., M.A. and Ph.D in political science (on a Ford Fellowship) from the University of Wisconsin-Madison. His doctoral study was interrupted with the onset of the Vietnam War to which he was drafted as a member of the U.S. Navy serving on USS Forrestal (CV-59) during the fire (1967-1968) as Division Officer. In 1986 he was an Instructor at the Chinese Ministry of Economic Affairs.

His book Menominee Drums, Tribal Termination and Restoration, 1954-1974 (University of Oklahoma Press), was a study of the termination and subsequent restoration of federal recognition of the Menominee Indian Tribe of Wisconsin. His work with the Menominee Nation has continued, off and on, for over 30 years which led him to research Indian gaming and other areas of interest within American Indian Studies. He also researched and taught public management and administration, public policy analysis, and engaged in the development and application of complexity theory in the study of American Indian policy.

Awards
 Elmer P. Pierson Teaching Award, Bloch School, 1986-87.
Marquis Who's Who, February 2008

Further Study
Menominee Drums: Tribal Termination and Restoration, 1954-1974, 2nd ed.,Norman, OK: University of Oklahoma Press: 2006.
Getting Control of the Greenfield City Budget (co-authored with Mark Funkhouser) in Public Administration: Cases in Managerial Role-Playing by Robert P. Watson.

See also
New England Complex Systems Institute
Menominee Tribe v. United States
Native American recognition in the United States
Menominee Restoration Act
Native American identity in the United States
Indian termination policy

References

External links
Nicholas Peroff profile at UMKC
Nicholas Peroff page at Bloch School
Nick Peroff at IRCKC

1944 births
Living people
American political scientists
Complex systems scientists
University of Wisconsin–Madison College of Letters and Science alumni
University of Missouri faculty